The mixed doubles tennis event of the 2011 Pan American Games was held from October 17–21 at the Telcel Tennis Complex in Guadalajara. The defending Pan American Games champion from 1995 is Shaun Stafford and Jack Waite of the United States.

The mixed doubles event is being held for the first time since the 1995 Pan American Games in Mar del Plata, because the event was added to the tennis program of the 2012 Summer Olympics in London.

Seeds

Draw

Finals

Top half

Bottom half

References 

Mixed Doubles